Enheduanna (also transliterated as , , or variants) was the priestess of the moon god Nanna (Sīn) in the Sumerian city-state of Ur in the reign of her father, Sargon of Akkad. She was likely appointed by her father as the leader of the religious cult at Ur to cement ties between the Akkadian religion of her father and the native Sumerian religion.

Enheduanna has been celebrated as the earliest known named author in world history, as a number of works in Sumerian literature, such as the Exaltation of Inanna feature her as the first person narrator, and other works, such as the Sumerian Temple Hymns may identify her as their author. However, there is considerable debate among modern Assyriologists based on linguistic and archaeological grounds as to whether or not she actually wrote or composed any of the rediscovered works that have been attributed to her. Additionally, the only manuscripts of the works attributed to her were written by scribes in the First Babylonian Empire six centuries after she lived, written in a more recent dialect of the Sumerian language than she would have spoken. These scribes may have attributed these works to her as part of the legendary narratives of the dynasty of Sargon of Akkad in later Babylonian traditions.

The cultural memory of Enheduanna and the works attributed to her were lost some time after the end of the First Babylonian Empire. Enheduanna's existence was first rediscovered by modern archaeology in 1927, when Sir Leonard Wooley excavated the Giparu in the ancient city of Ur and found an alabaster disk with her name, association with Sargon of Akkad, and occupation inscribed on the reverse. References to her name were then later discovered in excavated works of Sumerian literature, which initiated investigation into her potential authorship of those works. Enheduanna's archaeological rediscovery has attracted a considerable amount of attention and scholarly debate in modern times related to her potential attribution as the first known named author. She has also received considerable attention in feminism, and the works attributed to her have also been studied as an early progenitor of classical rhetoric. English translations of her works have also inspired a number of literary adaptations and representations.

Background 
Enheduanna's father was Sargon of Akkad, founder of the Akkadian Empire. In a surviving inscription Sargon styles himself "Sargon, king of Akkad, overseer (mashkim) of Inanna, king of Kish, anointed (guda) of Anu, king of the land [Mesopotamia], governor (ensi) of Enlil". The inscription celebrates the conquest of Uruk and the defeat of Lugalzagesi, whom Sargon brought "in a collar to the gate of Enlil": "Sargon, king of Akkad, overseer of Inanna, king of Kish, anointed of Anu, king of the land, governor of Enlil: he defeated the city of Uruk and tore down its walls, in the battle of Uruk he won, took Lugalzagesi king of Uruk in the course of the battle, and led him in a collar to the gate of Enlil". Sargon then conquered Ur and "laid waste" the territory from Lagash to the sea, ultimately conquering at least 34 cities in total.

Having conquered Ur, Irene J. Winter states that Sargon likely sought to "consolidate the Akkadian dynasty's links with the traditional Sumerian past in the important cult and political center of Ur" by appointing Enheduanna to an important position in the native Sumerian moon god cult. Winter states that is likely that the position she was appointed to already existed beforehand, and that her appointment to this role, and the attribution to Nanna would have helped her forge a syncreticism between the Sumerian religion and the Semitic religion. After Enheduanna, the role of high priestess continued to be held by members of the royal family. Joan Goodnick Westenholz suggests that the role of high priestess appears to have held a similar level of honor to that of a king; as the high priestess of Nanna, Enheduanna would have served as the embodiment of Ningal, spouse of Nanna, which would have given her actions divine authority. However, although the Giparu in Ur where the en priestess of Nanna worshipped has been extensively studied by archaeologists, we have no definitive information about what their duties were.

Rebellion of Lugal-Ane 
Toward the end of the reign of Sargon's grandson Narām-Sîn, numerous former city-states rebelled against the Akkadian central power. From hints in the song Nin me šara ("the Exaltation of Inana"), the events can be reconstructed from the point of view of Enheduanna: A certain Lugal-Ane came to power in the city of Ur, who as the new ruler invoked the legitimacy of the city god Nanna. Lugal-Ane is probably identical with a Lugal-An-na or Lugal-An-né, who is mentioned in ancient Babylonian literary texts about the war as king of Ur. Apparently Lugal-Ane demanded that the high priestess and consort of the moon god Enheduanna had to confirm his assumption of power. En-ḫedu-anna, as representative of the Sargonid dynasty, refused, whereupon she was suspended from her office and expelled from the city. The mention of the temple E-ešdam-ku indicates that she then found refuge in the city of Ĝirsu. In this exile, she composed the song Nin me šara, the performance of which was intended to persuade the goddess Inanna (as Ištar the patron goddess of her dynasty) to intervene on behalf of the Akkadian empire.

At least, King Narām-Sîn succeeded in putting down the rebellion of Lugal-Ane and other kings and restored the Akkadian central authority for the remaining years of his reign. Probably Enheduanna then returned to her office in the city of Ur.

Archaeological artifact 

In 1927, as part of excavations at Ur, British archaeologist Sir Leonard Woolley discovered an alabaster disk shattered into several pieces, which has since been reconstructed. The reverse side of the disk identifies Enheduanna as the wife of Nanna and daughter of Sargon of Akkad. The front side shows the high priestess standing in worship as what has been interpreted as a nude male figure pours a libation. Irene Winter states that "given the placement and attention to detail" of the central figure, "she has been identified as Enheduanna" Two seals bearing her name, belonging to her servants and dating to the Sargonic period, have been excavated at the Giparu at Ur.

Two of the works attributed to Enheduanna, "The Exaltation of Inanna" and "Inanna and Ebih" have survived in numerous manuscripts due to their presence in the Decad, an advanced scribal curriculum in the First Babylonian Empire of the 18th and 17th centuries BCE. Black et al. suggest that "perhaps Enheduanna has survived in scribal literature" due to the "continuing fascination with the dynasty of her father Sargon of Akkad".

Attributed works 
The first person to connect the disk and seals with literary works excavated in Nippur was Adam Falkenstein, who observed that the Temple Hymns and two hymns to Inanna: The Exaltation of Inanna and another "Hymn to Inanna" (at the time not yet reconstructed) contained references to Enheduanna. Falkenstein suggested that this might be evidence of Enheduanna's authorship, but acknowledged that the hymns are only known from the later Old Babylonian period and that more work would need to be done constructing and analyzing the received texts before any conclusions could be made. In 1989, Westenholz suggested that Inanna and Ebih and two other hymns, to Nanna at Ur, might also have been written by her.

Temple hymns 
These hymns have been reconstructed from 37 tablets from Ur and Nippur, most of which date to the Ur III and Old Babylonian periods. Each hymn is dedicated to a particular deity from the Sumerian pantheon and a city with which the deity was associated, and may have helped to create syncreticism between the native Sumerian religion and the Semitic religion of the Akkadian empire. However, some of these poems, such as hymn 9, addressed to the temple of the deified king Sulgi from the later Third Dynasty of Ur, cannot have been written by Enheduanna or anyone in the Akkadian empire, showing that the collection may have gained additional poems over time.

The first translation of the collection into English was by Åke W. Sjöberg, who also argued that the mention of a "subscript" or colophon of two lines near the end of the composition appear to credit her with composition of the preceding text. However, Black shows that in the majority of manuscripts, the line following this colophon, which contains the line count for the 42nd and final hymn, demonstrates that the preceding two lines are part of the 42nd hymn. Black concludes that: "At most... it might be reasonable to accept a claim for (Enheduanna)'s authorship or editorship" for only Hymn 42, the final hymn in the collection.

Hymns dedicated to Inanna

The Exaltation of Inanna 
Nin me šara ("Mistress of the innumerable me"; modern also The Exaltation of Inana / Inana B) is a hymn to the goddess Inanna of 154 lines. According to Claus Wilcke, the text "belongs to the most difficult that exists in the literary tradition in Sumerian". The first complete edition of Nin me šara was produced by Hallo / van Dijk in 1968. A fundamentally new edition based on a broader textual foundation as well as recent linguistic research and textual criticism was published by Annette Zgoll in 1997, with further improvements in Zgoll 2014 and 2021.

The work refers to the rebellion of Lugal-Ane and Enheduanna's exile. Probably composed in exile in Ĝirsu, the song is intended to persuade the goddess Inanna to intervene in the conflict in favor of Enheduanna and the Sargonian dynasty. To reach this, the text constructs a myth: An, the king of the gods, endows the goddess Inanna with divine powers and has her execute his judgment on all the cities of Sumer, making her herself the ruler of the land and most powerful of all the gods. When now the city of Ur rebels against her rule, Inanna passes her judgment over it and has it executed by Nanna, the city god of Ur and her father. Inanna has thus become the mistress of heaven and earth alike - and thus empowered to enforce her will even over the originally superior gods (An and Nanna), which results in the destruction of Ur and Lugal-Ane.

Hymn to Inanna 
This hymn (incipit in-nin ša-gur-ra) which is only partially preserved in a fragmentary form, is outlined by Black et al. as containing three parts: an introductory section (lines 1-90) emphasizing Inanna's "martial abilities"; a long, middle section (lines 91-218) that serves as a direct address to Inanna, listing her many positive and negative powers, and asserting her superiority over other deities, and a concluding section (219–274) narrated by Enheduanna that exists in a very fragmentary form.

Black et al. surmise that the fragmentary nature of the concluding section makes it unclear whether Enheduanna composed the hymn, the concluding section was a later addition, or that her name was added to the poem later in the Old Babylonian period from "a desire to attribute it to her". They also note that the concluding section also appears to reference "some historical events which cannot be elucidated." This poem also contains a potential reference to the events described in Inanna and Ebih, which has led Westenholz to suggest that that poem may have been written by Enheduanna as well.

The first English translation of this work was by Sjöberg in 1975.

Inanna and Ebih 
This hymn (incipit in-nin me-huš-a) is characterized by Black et al. as "Inanna in warrior mode." The poem starts with a hymn to Inanna as "lady of battle" (lines 1–24) then shifts to a narration by Inanna herself in the first person (lines 25–52), where she describes the revenge she wants to take on the mountains of Ebih for their refusal to bow to her. 

Inanna then visits the sky god An and requests his assistance (lines 53–111), but An doubts Inanna's ability to take revenge (lines 112–130). This causes Inanna to fly into a rage and attack Ebih (lines 131–159). Inanna then recounts how she overthrew Ebih (lines 160–181) and the poem ends with a praise of Inanna (lines 182–184).
The "rebel lands" of Ebih that are overthrown in the poem have been identifiedwith the Jebel Hamrin mountain range in modern Iraq.  Black et al. describe these lands as "home to the nomadic, barbarian tribes who loom large in Sumerian literature as forces of destruction and chaos" that sometimes need to be "brought under divine control".

Hymns dedicated to Nanna 
These two hymns, labeled by Westenholz as Hymn of Praise to Ekisnugal and Nanna on [the] Assumption of En-ship (incipit e ugim e-a) and Hymn of Praise of Enheduanna (incipit lost). The second hymn is very fragmentary.

Authorship debate 
The question of Enheduanna's authorship of poems has been subject to significant debate. While Hallo and Åke Sjoberg were the first to definitively assert Enheduanna's authorship of the works attributed to her, other Assyriologists including Miguel Civil and Jeremy Black have put forth arguments rejecting or doubting Enheduanna's authorship.  Civil has raised the possibility that "Enheduanna" refers not to the name, but instead the station of EN-priestess that the daughter of Sargon of Akkad held.

For the Inanna and Nanna poems, Black et al. argue that at best, all of the manuscript sources date from at least six centuries after when she would have lived, and they were found in scribal settings, not ritual ones, and that "surviving sources show no traces of Old Sumerian... making it impossible to posit what that putative original might have looked like."

Despite these concerns, Hallo says that there is still little reason to doubt Enheduanna's authorship of these works. Hallo, responding to Miguel Civil, not only still maintains Enheduanna's authorship of all of the works attributed to her, but rejects "excess skepticism" in Assyriology as a whole, and noting that "rather than limit the inferences they draw from it" other scholars should consider that "the abundant textual documentation from Mesopotamia... provides a precious resource for tracing the origins and evolution of countless facets of civilization."

Summarizing the debate, Paul A. Delnero, professor of Assyriology at Johns Hopkins University, remarks that "the attribution is exceptional, and against the practice of anonymous authorship during the period; it almost certainly served to invest these compositions with an even greater authority and importance than they would have had otherwise, rather than to document historical reality".

Influence and legacy 
Enheduanna has received substantial attention in feminism. In a BBC Radio 4 interview, Assyriologist Eleanor Robson credits this to the feminist movement of the 1970s, when, two years after attending a lecture by Cyrus H. Gordon in 1976, American anthropologist Marta Weigle introduced Enheduanna to an audience of feminist scholars as "the first known author in world literature" with her introductory essay "Women as Verbal Artists: Reclaiming the Sisters of Enheduanna". Robson says that after this publication, the "feminist image of Enheduanna... as a wish fulfillment figure" really took off. Rather than as a "pioneer poetess" of feminism, Robson states that the picture of Enheduanna from the surviving works of the 18th century BCE is instead one of her as "her father's political and religious instrument". Robson also stresses that we have neither "access to what Enheduanna thought or did" or "evidence that (Enheduanna) was able to write", but that as the high priestess and daughter of Sargon of Akkad, Enheduanna was "probably the most privileged woman of her time".

Enheduanna has also been analyzed as an early rhetorical theorist. Roberta Binkley finds evidence in The Exaltation of Inanna of invention and classical modes of persuasion. Hallo, building on the work of Binkley, compares the sequence of the Hymn to Inanna, Inanna and Ebih, and the Exaltation of Inanna to the biblical Book of Amos, and considers these both evidence of "the birth of rhetoric in Mesopotamia."

See also 

List of female poets

Notes

References

Further reading

Pryke, Louise M. (2017). "Enheduanna and Ancient Literature." Ishtar: Gods and heroes. London and New York, Routledge, pp. 16-18. ISBN 9781138860735

External links 

English Translations of works attributed to Enheduanna at the Electronic Text Corpus of Sumerian Literature
Inanna and Ebih
The Exaltation of Inanna (Inanna B)
Hymn to Inanna (Inanna C)
Temple Hymns Collection
 Artifacts depicting Enheduanna
Disk of Enheduanna in the Penn Museum Collections Database
Spotlight on the Disk of Enheduanna (Penn Museum Blog)
Disk of Enheduanna
Seal of Enheduanna

23rd-century BC births
23rd-century BC deaths
23rd-century BC writers
23rd-century BC women writers
23rd-century BC clergy
23rd-century BC people
1927 archaeological discoveries
Akkadian Empire
Akkadian people
Ancient Asian women writers
Ancient Near Eastern scribes
Ancient Mesopotamian women
Ancient poets
Ancient priestesses
Ancient women poets
Hymnwriters
Inanna
Sumerian people
Ur
Women hymnwriters
Women religious writers
Deified women